Minutemen were civilian militia units during the American Revolutionary War.

Minutemen, Minute Men, or Minuteman may also refer to:

Political and military groups
 Minuteman Civil Defense Corps, a group dedicated to preventing illegal crossings of the U.S. border, founded in the 2000s
 Minuteman Project, an organization that monitors illegal immigrants on the United States–Mexico borders, founded in 2005
 Minutemen (anti-Communist organization), headed by Robert DePugh, founded in the early 1960s
 Minutemen (Missouri Secessionist Paramilitaries), a pro-secession paramilitary organization active in St. Louis, Missouri, US from Jan-May 1861
 Culpeper Minutemen, a militia formed in Virginia, US in 1775
 VR-55 Minutemen, a US Navy Reserve C-130 squadron

Arts, entertainment, and media

Art and music 
The Minute Man (1874), a sculpture by Daniel Chester French in Concord, Massachusetts, US
 The Lexington Minuteman (1900), a sculpture by Henry Hudson Kitson, located in Lexington, Massachusetts, US
 Minutemen (band), a 1980s punk group

Comics 
 Minutemen (Watchmen), a team of comic book characters found in Alan Moore's Watchmen
 Minutemen (Marvel Comics), agents of the Time Variance Authority
 Minute-Man, a comic book superhero appearing in Fawcett Comics and DC Comics
 The Minutemen (100 Bullets), fictional characters in the 100 Bullets comic series
 Before Watchmen: Minutemen, a comic book series by Darwyn Cooke

Fiction 
 Minutemen (film), a 2008 science-fiction Disney Channel Original Movie
 Minute Men, a paramilitary body in the 1935 Sinclair Lewis novel, It Can't Happen Here
 The Minutemen, a faction in the 2015 video game Fallout 4
 Minutemen, soldiers working for the Time Variance Authority (TVA) in the Disney+ series Loki

Places
 Minute Man National Historical Park, a park commemorating the American Revolution
 Minuteman Bikeway, a paved path/trail in eastern Massachusetts
 Minuteman Career and Technical High School, a vocational high school in Lexington, Massachusetts, US
 Minuteman Library Network, a library network in Massachusetts
 Minuteman Missile National Historic Site, two deactivated Minuteman missile sites

Sports
 Boston Minutemen, a soccer team
 Missouri Minutemen, an indoor football team
 UMass Minutemen and Minutewomen, a nickname for University of Massachusetts Amherst athletes

Other uses
 LGM-30 Minuteman, an American intercontinental ballistic missile (ICBM) weapons system
 Minuteman Salsa, a former brand of American made salsa